Dmitri Andreyevich Vasilenko (12 November 1975 – 4 November 2019) was an Olympic gymnast who competed for Russia in the 1996 Olympic Games. He  won gold medal in the team competition. He was an alternate to the 2000 Olympic team.

After his career ended, he moved to France to coach, but was diagnosed with ALS in 2008. According to former teammate Alexei Nemov’s Instagram page, Vasilenko’s relatives informed Nemov that Vasilenko was in a coma on life support. Two days later, Nemov confirmed on Instagram Vasilenko had died on 4 November 2019, eight days before he was to turn 44 years old.

See also
List of Olympic male artistic gymnasts for Russia

References

External links
sports-reference.com

1975 births
2019 deaths
Russian male artistic gymnasts
Gymnasts at the 1996 Summer Olympics
Olympic gymnasts of Russia
Olympic gold medalists for Russia
People from Cherkessk
Medalists at the World Artistic Gymnastics Championships
Olympic medalists in gymnastics
Medalists at the 1996 Summer Olympics
Neurological disease deaths in France
Deaths from motor neuron disease
Sportspeople from Karachay-Cherkessia
20th-century Russian people